The name of school Shree kitini (10+2) higher school is in Lalitpur district in Nepal. This school was established in 2004 B.S (1947 AD) at the palace Taukhel. This is a government school.

See also
List of schools in Nepal

References
http://np.linkedin.com/pub/chiranjibi-acharya/3a/a63/2b4http://www.lamadre.org/pdfs/nepal_update1008.pdf

Schools in Nepal
1957 establishments in Nepal